Concrete is widely used construction material all over the world. It is composed of aggregate, cement and water. Composition of concrete varies to suit for different applications desired. Even size of the aggregate can influence mechanical properties of concrete to a great extent.

Peculiarities of concrete

Response to tensile and compressive loading

Concrete is strong in compression but weak in tension. When tensile loads are applied, concrete undergoes fracture easily. The reason behind this phenomenon can be explained as follows. The aggregates in concrete are capable of taking compressive stresses so that concrete withstands compressive loading. But during tensile loading cracks are formed which separates the cement particles which hold the aggregates together. This separation of cement particles causes the entire structure to fail as crack propagates. This problem in concrete is resolved by the introduction of reinforcing components such as metallic bars, ceramic fibres etc. These components act as a skeleton of the entire structure and are capable of holding aggregates under tensile loading. This is known as Reinforcement of Concrete.

Material properties

Concrete may be referred to as a brittle material. This is because concrete's behaviour under loading is completely different from that of ductile materials like steel. But actually concrete differs from ideal brittle materials in many aspects. In modern fracture mechanics concrete is considered as a quasi-brittle material. Quasi-brittle materials possess considerable hardness which is similar to ceramic hardness, so often it is called ceramic hardness. The reason for ceramic hardness can be explained on the basis of subcritical cracking that happens during loading of concrete. Subcritical cracking in concrete which precedes ultimate failure, results in nonlinear StressStrain response and Rcurve behaviour. So concrete obtains hardness from subcritical failure.
Also concrete has a heterogeneous structure due to uneven composition of ingredients in it. This also complicates the analysis of concrete by producing misleading results.

LEFM and concrete

Linear Elastic Fracture Mechanics yields reliable results in the field of ductile materials like steel. Most of the experiments and theories in fracture mechanics are formulated taking ductile materials as object of interest. But if we compare the salient features in LEFM with results derived from the testing of concrete, we may find it irrelevant and sometimes trivial. For example, LEFM permits infinite stress at crack tip. This makes no sense in real analysis of concrete where the stress at crack tip is fixed. And LEFM fails to calculate stress at crack tip precisely. So we need some other ways to find out what is stress at crack tip and distribution stress near crack tip.

LEFM cannot answer many phenomenon exhibited by concrete. Some examples are 
 Size Effect (some properties are strongly dependent on size of specimen selected).
 Unobjectivity of Finite Element analysis due to mesh size dependence.
 Concept of Fracture energy or Crack energy is not known in LEFM.
 Inability to explain strain softening or quasi softening in concrete.

Fracture Process Zone (FPZ) in concrete

In LEFMPA, during cracking, no specific region is mentioned in between the area which is cracked and that which is not. But it is evident that in concrete, there is some intermediate space between cracked and uncracked portion. This region is defined as the Fracture Process Zone (FPZ). FPZ consists of micro cracks which are minute individual cracks situated nearer to crack tip. As the crack propagates these micro cracks merge and becomes a single structure to give continuity to the already existing crack. So indeed, FPZ acts as a bridging zone between cracked region and uncracked region. Analysis of this zone deserves special notice because it is very helpful to predict the propagation of crack and ultimate failure in concrete.
In steel (ductile) FPZ is very small and therefore strain hardening dominates over strain softening. Also due to small FPZ, crack tip can easily be distinguished from uncracked metal. And in ductile materials FPZ is a yielding zone.

When we consider FPZ in concrete, we find that FPZ is sufficiently large and contains micro cracks. And cohesive pressure still remains in the region. So strain softening is prevalent in this region. Due to the presence of comparatively large FPZ, locating a precise crack tip is not possible in concrete.

 = Ultimate strength

 = crack width

Area under the curve = Fracture Energy

Pre-peak and post-peak response of steel and concrete

If we plot stress (Pascal) vs. strain (percentage deformation) characteristics of a material, the maximum stress up to which the material can be loaded is known as peak value. The behaviour of concrete and steel can be compared to understand the difference in their fracture characteristics.
For this a strain controlled loading of un-notched specimen of each materials can be done. From the observations we can draw these conclusions:

Pre-peak

 Steel exhibits linear elastic response up to yield stress and strain approximately 0.1%. After that it undergoes plastic deformation due internal dislocations up to a strain corresponding to 25%.
 Concrete exhibits linear response to a stress value: 0.6  (60% of peak stress), then after internal microcracking induces plastic response up to peak stress value. This peak value is observed at a strain of approximately 0.01%.

Post-peak

Metals behaviour after peak value of stress is still a dilemma to scientists. After this peak value necking complicates the analysis and it is of no practical usefulness.
 In post peak zone concrete exhibits additional strains. We can observe a localized crack and elastic unloading in this region. Also a strain cannot be properly defined at the crack, we may prefer a stress crack opening displacement (σ-COD) model for the purpose of analysis.

Fracture mechanics of concrete

Concept of fracture energy

Fracture energy is defined as the energy required to open unit area of crack surface. It is a material property and does not depend on size of structure. This can be well understood from the definition that it is defined for a unit area and thus influence of size is removed.

Fracture energy can be expressed as the sum of surface creation energy and surface separation energy. Fracture energy found to be increasing as we approach crack tip.

Fracture energy is a function of displacement and not strain. Fracture energy deserves prime role in determining ultimate stress at crack tip.

Mesh size dependence

In Finite Element Method analysis of concrete, if mesh size is varied, then entire result varies according to it. This is called mesh size dependence. If mesh size is higher, then the structure can withstand  more stress. But such results obtained from FEM analysis contradict real case.

Size effect

In classical Fracture Mechanics, critical stress value is considered as a material property. So it is same for a particular material of any shape and size. But in practice, it is observed that, in some materials like plain concrete size has a strong influence on critical stress value. So fracture mechanics of concrete consider critical stress value a material property as well as a size dependent parameter.

Bažant's size effect relation
=/√(1+{/})

where

= Critical stress

 = tensile strength

 = size of specimen

 = empirical constant

 = maximum aggregate size

This clearly proves that material size and even the component size like aggregate size can influence cracking of concrete.

Computational models for fracture analysis

Because of the heterogeneous nature of concrete, it responds to already existing crack testing models "anomaly". And it is evident that alteration of existing models was required to answer the unique fracture mechanics characteristics of concrete.

Earlier models
Dugdale model
Major assumptions of this model were:
 A plastic zone is present near the crack tip.
 Critical stress value is  a constant and it is equal to yield stress across the crack.

Barenblatt model
 A plastic zone is present near the crack tip.
 Critical stress value is varying along with deformation produced.

The main drawback of both these models was negligence of concept of fracture energy.

Fictitious crack model or Hillerborg model

The model proposed by Hillerborg in 1976, was the first model to analyse concrete fracture making use of the fracture energy concept. In this model, Hillerborg describes two crack regions namely,
 True or physical crack
 Fictitious crack or fracture process zone (FPZ)

True crack region
is the outer most part where cracking process is completed and no stresses can be propagated through this zone. COD is comparatively high and more or less constant.
In this region we have both stress discontinuity and displacement discontinuity.
Fracture process zone
 situated just interior to the True crack region where crack is initiating and propagating.
In this zone at crack tip, we have peak stress = tensile strength of concrete.

Along the FPZ stress is continuous and displacement is discontinuous.

Crack propagation in FPZ starts when critical stress is equal to tensile strength of concrete and as crack starts propagating, stress does not become zero. Using the plot of fracture energy versus crack width, we can calculate critical stress at any point including crack tip. So one of the major drawbacks of LEFM is overcome using fracture energy approach. Direction of crack propagation can also be determined by identifying the direction of maximum energy release rate.

Concept of characteristic length
Hillerborg defined a parameter called Hillerborg characteristic length() which is numerically expressed as,

 

where

= characteristic length

= Young's Modulus

 = fracture energy

 = critical stress value

Hillerborg characteristic length can be used to predict brittleness of a material. As magnitude of characteristic length decreases brittle nature dominates and vice versa.

Crack band model

Proposed by Bazant and Oh in 1983, this theory can well attribute materials whose homogeneous nature changes over a certain range randomly. So we select any  particular  more or less homogeneous volume for the purpose of analysis. Hence we can determine the stresses and strains. The size of this region should be several times that of maximum aggregate. Otherwise the data obtained will be of no physical significance.
Fracture Process Zone is modelled with bands of smeared crack. And to overcome the Finite Element Method unobjectivity, we use cracking criterion of fracture energy.

Crack width is estimated as the product of crack band width and element strain. 
In finite element analysis, the crack band width is the element size of fracture process path.

References

See also 
 
 
 
 
 

Concrete
Fracture mechanics
Physical models